Mitrella antares is a species of sea snail in the family Columbellidae, the dove snails.

Distribution
This species occurs in the Atlantic Ocean off Brazil.

References

External links
 Costa, P. M.S. & de Souza, P. J. S. (2001). Two new species of Mitrella Risso, 1826 (Gastropoda, Columbellidae) from west Atlantic. Iberus. 19(2): 15-21

antares
Gastropods described in 2001